Ham is a municipality located in the Belgian province of Limburg. On January 1, 2006, Ham had a total population of 9,705.

Demographics 

In August, 2008 the population of Ham exceeded 10,000 inhabitants.

Fusion 
The municipality of Ham was created January 1977 by the fusion of the municipalities of Oostham and Kwaadmechelen.

References

External links 
 
  - Only available in Dutch

Municipalities of Limburg (Belgium)